Aleksandr Fyodorovich Makarov (born 11 February 1951 in Kasimov, Ryazan) is a Soviet athlete who mainly competed in the javelin throw.

He competed for the Soviet Union at the 1980 Summer Olympics held in Moscow, Soviet Union, where he won the silver medal in the men's javelin throw, with a distance of 89.64 metres.
He is the father of former javelin thrower Sergey Makarov.

References
 
 

1951 births
Living people
People from Kasimov
Soviet male javelin throwers
Russian male javelin throwers
Olympic athletes of the Soviet Union
Olympic silver medalists for the Soviet Union
Athletes (track and field) at the 1980 Summer Olympics
Medalists at the 1980 Summer Olympics
Olympic silver medalists in athletics (track and field)
Sportspeople from Ryazan Oblast